Jack Lawrence  (born 1975 in Canterbury, Kent) is a British comics creator. Prior to 2002 he also worked as an animator.

Career

Early beginnings
Lawrence took a General Art and Design BTEC First Diploma at Canterbury Technical College, then went on to the KIAD at Canterbury to study for a BTEC National in the same subject. After becoming disenchanted with art education, he then worked "regular" jobs to train himself in the field he wanted to be in. In 2000, he became a character animator for the UK-based Web design company Lightmaker. He worked there for three years before becoming a freelance artist.

Lawrence came onto the comics scene with his own title, Darkham Vale, which he created, wrote, and drew, with the series running for ten issues. It received acclaim, especially for a new creator and a small publisher.

He went on to find success with Lions, Tigers and Bears, written by Mike Bullock and published by Image. A four-issue series, Lions, Tigers and Bears, was a surprise hit that revolved around a young boy and his stuffed animals.

Lawrence is now a successful freelance comics illustrator, working on titles such as A.T.O.M., Doctor Who Adventures and 2000 AD.

IDW Publishing
He is currently working on several projects for IDW Publishing and is self-publishing his creator-owned title Tinpot Hobo which he writes, pencils, inks, colours and letters.

Bibliography

Eaglemoss Publications

Web and Circus

Zoovolution (pencils, inks, colour) (2008–2009)

Hachette UK

Tyranno Quest books 1-4 (Cover and Interior Art) (2012)
Blood Crown Quest books 1-4 (Cover and Interior Art) (2013)
Atlantis Quest books 1-4 (Cover and Interior Art) (2014)
Immortals books 1-4 (Cover and Interior Art) (2015)

Egmont UK

Angry Birds Magazine (Issues 1–4) (Covers, interior illustrations) (2014)

Titan Books

References

Bibliography

External links

2000 AD profile (Archived)
Website

External links

DeviantArt

1975 births
Living people
British comics writers
British comics artists
Marvel Comics people
Marvel Comics writers
People from Canterbury